Shahba, Hama  is a Syrian village located in Sabburah Subdistrict in Salamiyah District, Hama.  According to the Syria Central Bureau of Statistics (CBS), Shahba, Hama had a population of 833 in the 2004 census.

References 

Populated places in Salamiyah District